Lachlan Anderson (born 27 August 1997) is an Australian professional rugby union footballer who plays wing for Super Rugby franchise the Rebels and the Australia national rugby sevens team. In his early career, he was selected to play in the 2017 World Rugby Under 20 Championships for Australia and formally played for Shute Shield clubs Randwick and Eastwood.

Anderson grew up in Baulkham Hills and played rugby for Dural rugby club. He was educated at Oakhill College where he played rugby and captained the first XV, the top representative team in secondary school with rugby league player Ryan Papenhuyzen. In rugby sevens he made his World Rugby Sevens Series debut in Sydney in 2017. Anderson has also represented his country at the 2018 Commonwealth Games.

Anderson was a member of the Australian men's rugby seven's squad at the Tokyo 2020 Olympics. The team came third in their pool round and then lost to Fiji 19-nil in the quarterfinal. Full details.

Super Rugby statistics

References

External links 

Lachie Anderson at Rugby AU.com.au

1997 births
Australian rugby union players
Living people
Rugby union flankers
Rugby union centres
Rugby union wings
Rugby union fullbacks
New South Wales Country Eagles players
Melbourne Rebels players
Australian rugby sevens players
Rugby sevens players at the 2020 Summer Olympics
Olympic rugby sevens players of Australia
People educated at Oakhill College